Wang Hongguang (born August 1949) is a retired lieutenant general in the Chinese People's Liberation Army (PLA).

Biography
Born in 1949, Wang enlisted in the People's Liberation Army in March 1968. He attained the rank of major general (shaojiang) in 1998. In February 1998 he was appointed president of the People's Liberation Army Armored Forces Academy. He was head of the General Equipment Support Bureau of People's Liberation Army General Armaments Department in September 2002, a position he held until December 2005, when he was transferred to Nanjing, Jiangsu and appointed deputy commander of Nanjing Military Region. He was promoted to the rank of  lieutenant general (Zhongjiang) in July 2007. He retired from military service in December 2012. 

He was a delegate to the 10th National People's Congress and a member of the 12th Chinese People's Political Consultative Conference.

Personal life
The couple have a son. They divorced in 2015.

Book

References

1949 births
People's Liberation Army generals from Shandong
Living people